Archery was contested as an exhibition sport at the 1962 Asian Games in Persija Football Stadium, Jakarta, Indonesia from 28 August to 1 September 1962.

A total of 21 archers from 3 nations competed at the games, Japan won two gold medals while Indonesia won the other gold medal.

Medalists

Medal table

Participating nations
A total of 21 athletes from 3 nations competed in archery at the 1962 Asian Games:

References

 Report

External links
OCA website

1962 Asian Games
Asian Games